HMS Impregnable was a 104-gun first rate three-decker ship of the line of the Royal Navy, launched on 1 August 1810 at Chatham. She was designed by Sir William Rule, and was the only ship built to her draught. 

During the Napoleonic Wars, she was used as the flagship of the Admiral the Duke of Clarence (later King William IV). She took part in the bombardment of Algiers in 1816 under the command of Admiral David Milne where she was second in the order of battle. In the attack on Algiers, Impregnable, isolated from the other ships was a large and tempting target, attracting attention from the Algerian gunners who raked her fore and aft, she was severely damaged. 268 shots hit the hull, the main mast was damaged in 15 places. Impregnable lost Mr. John Hawkins, midshipman, 37 seamen, 10 marines and 2 boys killed and Mr. G. N. Wesley, Mr. Henry Quinn, 111 seamen, 21 marines, 9 sappers and miners and 17 boys wounded. The Impregnable saw little further action, apart from a short commission in the Mediterranean, and in 1819 she was placed in the Reserve Fleet at Devonport. From May 1839 to October 1841 she had relieved  as the Commander-in-Chief's flagship moored at the entrance to the Hamoaze. She then saw service again in the Mediterranean until May 1843, when she was once again laid up with the reserve fleet at Devonport.

Impregnable was rated as a training ship in 1862 and removed from the reserve fleet to begin service at Devonport training boy seamen for the Royal Navy.

On 27 September 1886, Impregnable was replaced by HMS Howe which was renamed HMS Bulwark as she became a training ship. The old Impregnable ended her days first as a tender to HMS Indus and then on 9 November 1888 she was renamed HMS Kent to be used as a hulk in the event of an epidemic. On that date, her name, Impregnable, was given to HMS Bulwark (the former HMS Howe), still serving at Devonport. Three years later on 22 September 1891, she was once again re-named, this time HMS Caledonia, and became a Scottish boys training / school ship moored at Queensferry in the Firth of Forth.

As HMS Caledonia, she was to spend the next 15 years at anchor in the Firth of Forth as a training ship for boys.  The ship was divided up for training by decks: The Upper Deck was used exclusively for sail drill, gunnery and recreation.  The Main and Middle decks were used for seamanship classes and instruction.  The Lower and Orlop decks were devoted to living and sleeping spaces.  The training ship accommodated 190 Officers and men as well as 800 boys.  Instruction covered boat pulling, sailing & gunnery.  It was hoped that this form of training would instil in the boys the qualities of resourcefulness, courage and self-reliance.  Theoretical instruction was undertaken in the 'Schoolroom'.  This room could accommodate 200 boys at once and often did. The 200 boys were broken down into classes of 15 – 20. Commander the Hon. Robert Francis Boyle was in command from August 1901.

She was sold for breaking up in 1906. The church is situated by the side of Loch Awe.

Beginning with HMS Bulwark in 1886 until Impregnable moved ashore in 1936 and becoming a stone frigate in the process, every subsequent vessel that served in this ship's stead as a school ship at Devonport had been renamed Impregnable in her honour. The training school eventually closed in 1948.

Notes

References

Lavery, Brian (2003) The Ship of the Line - Volume 1: The development of the battlefleet 1650-1850. Conway Maritime Press. .
Michael Phillips. Impregnable (98) (1810). Michael Phillips' Ships of the Old Navy. Retrieved 19 August 2007.

External links
 

Ships of the line of the Royal Navy
Ships built in Chatham
1810 ships